Grindelia oaxacana is a rare North American species of flowering plants in the family Asteraceae. It is native to southwestern Mexico, found only in the State of Oaxaca.

Leaves are oblong or egg-shaped, up to 5 cm long even high on the stem, thus larger than the leaves of related species. Each head has 16-22 ray flowers surrounding numerous disc flowers.

References

oaxacana
Endemic flora of Mexico
Flora of Oaxaca
Plants described in 1934